Lieutenant-General Sir Andrew Richard Gregory,  (born 19 November 1957) is a retired British Army officer who served as Deputy Chief of the Defence Staff. In September 2016, he became Controller SSAFA, The Armed Forces charity. He was appointed Master Gunner, St James's Park from 1 May 2017.

Early life and education
Gregory was born on 19 November 1957 to Lieutenant Colonel Richard B. Gregory and Alison Gregory (née Egerton). He was educated at Sedbergh School.

Military career
Gregory was commissioned into the Royal Artillery in 1981. As a brigadier, he served in Iraq. Promoted to major general in 2007, Gregory was appointed Collocation Implementation Team Leader for the amalgamation of Land Command and Headquarters Adjutant-General at Andover, which took place in April 2008. He became Director General, Personnel later that year, Military Secretary in February 2011, and Deputy Chief of the Defence Staff (Personnel and Training) with promotion to lieutenant general in April 2013. This role has since been re-designated Chief of the Defence People.

Gregory retired from the army on 16 August 2016.

Later life
In September 2016, Gregory became Controller of SSAFA, The Armed Forces charity. He was appointed Master Gunner, St James's Park from 1 May 2017, and a Vice Lord-Lieutenant of Wiltshire on 16 January 2023.

Honours
In 2010, Gregory was appointed a Companion of the Order of the Bath (CB). In the 2016 Birthday Honours, he was appointed Knight Commander of the Order of the British Empire (KBE).

References

 

|-

|-

 

1957 births
Living people
Companions of the Order of the Bath
Royal Artillery officers
British Army lieutenant generals
People educated at Sedbergh School
Knights Commander of the Order of the British Empire
Military personnel from Glasgow